Wuthering Heights is a British television series which first aired on BBC 2 in 1967. It is an adaptation of the 1847 novel Wuthering Heights by Emily Brontë.

Produced and broadcast in colour, the series had its original videotape masters wiped for reuse, although black and white film copies survived destruction and are available on DVD.

Plot summary

Main cast
 Ian McShane as Heathcliff
 Angela Scoular as  Catherine Earnshaw 
 John Garrie as Joseph
 Anne Stallybrass as  Ellen
 Anthony Edwards as  Robert
 James Haswell as Manservant
 Jeremy Longhurst as Lockwood
 William Marlowe as  Hindley
 Angela Douglas as Isabella Linton
 Drewe Henley as  Edgar Linton
 Keith Buckley as Hareton

References

Bibliography
 Ellen Baskin. Serials on British Television, 1950-1994. Scolar Press, 1996.

External links
 

BBC television dramas
1967 British television series debuts
1967 British television series endings
1960s British drama television series
English-language television shows
Television series set in the 19th century